Point Edward is a village in the Canadian province of Ontario. Adjacent to the city of Sarnia in Lambton County, Point Edward sits opposite Port Huron, Michigan and is connected to it by the Blue Water Bridge, at the meeting point of the St. Clair River and Lake Huron.  Formerly called Huron, it was renamed in 1860 to mark the visit by the then Prince of Wales, later Edward VII.  Incorporated 1879. In the Canada 2016 Census, the population of Point Edward was 2,037, an increase of 0.1 percent from its 2011 population of 2,034.

In the summer of 2003, Point Edward celebrated its 125th anniversary.

Municipal government

The current mayor of Point Edward is Bev Hand.

In the late 1980s, the provincial government initiated a plan to amalgamate Point Edward with the larger city of Sarnia, although many residents opposed the merger and the plan was abandoned in 1991. Even under the Progressive Conservative Party of Ontario government of Premier Mike Harris, which forced amalgamations of many municipalities in the province (including of many towns which were geographically distinct settlements) in the late 1990s, Point Edward remained untouched. Despite this, some municipal government services in Point Edward are provided on contract by the city of Sarnia. For example, Point Edward is served by both Sarnia Transit and Bluewater Power Distribution, Sarnia's municipally-owned hydroelectricity provider.

Economy

Most businesses in Point Edward are independently owned. The only franchises located in the village are hotels and the Gateway Casino Point Edward.

Gateway Casino Point Edward 
The Gateway Point Edward Casino is located on the Village of Point Edward's waterfront on Venetian Boulevard. The casino holds over 450 slot machines and tables, and takes pride for being involved within the community. It sponsors town events and helps the surrounding economy by offering and creating jobs and purchasing goods locally. Funds and game revenue are directly paid to the municipal government of Point Edward for hosting the casino, generating 33.4 million dollars to date for Point Edward's economy. The establishment also has an in-casino restaurant called Getaway which seats its guests both inside and outside, viewing the Blue Water Bridge waterfront. The casino was built reusing the frame of an abandoned 1950s Canadian National Railway shed, as it was located right next to the St. Clair River.

Local Business

Albert's Rolling Lunch 

A recent fry truck turned restaurant, Albert's now occupies a store on Point Edward’s downtown waterfront on the corner of Michigan and Livingston Street. This two-part business consists of an eatery and ice cream shop serving French fries and barbecued favourites as well as various flavours of ice cream.  Albert's offers a well-sized dining area indoors as well as a picnic area just outside of the building, overlooking Waterfront Park.

The Cheese Wedge 
The Cheese Wedge is located in the plaza on the corner of Michigan and Arthur Street. It houses a wide variety of cheeses and hosts public tastings every week.

Ice Cream Galore 
Originated in 1977, Ice Cream Galore is a household favourite ice-creamery that is located at the heart of Point Edward, on the corner of Michigan and St. Clair Street.  The Galore offers a wide variety of ice cream served in their home made waffle cones. Also, a selection of ice cream cakes and beverages are available to customers for any occasions.

The Watermark 
The Watermark Bistro is a locally-owned pub and restaurant located in downtown Point Edward. The Bistro offers a diverse food and drink menu with a unique appetizer selection, one that cannot be found anywhere else in Lambton County. The restaurant holds a cozy inside seating area as well as a small outdoor patio overlooking the downtown strip. A daily promotional "Splashy Hour" is advertised from 3:006:00p.m. that offers half off drinks and appetizers during that time.

Bridge Tavern 
The Bridge Tavern was a locally-owned fish fry and pub. Operated by Vicky and John Brodimas, it opened in 1959 and closed on June 30, 2016. It was the  "oldest establishment in Point Edward, a household name and local favourite eatery". In 1987, the restaurant added a large banquet room, bringing up total capacity to 200 seats. Live entertainment included Big Kenny, and then Joan Spalding and her band played in the last 16 years. It was also famous for its Bridge Tavern butter tarts. However there was stiff competition from the Casino and there were no buyers for the business. The former building was torn down after several structural deficiencies were discovered inside the restaurant, office and second-level apartments.

Arena 

The Point Edward Arena is a year round facility consisting of an ice rink with an attached recreational hall . It hosts ice hockey and figure skating events in the winter as well as specialized flooring for other sports held in the summer. The facility is open for rent to the public for special events and tournament hosting. The Point Edward Arena is also the home of the Point Edward Blackhawks Minor Hockey Team.

Events 
Point Edward hosts a number of events on its waterfront year-round, attracting participants locally and from other cities.

Mackinac Pancake Breakfast 

In the midst of summer events in Lambton County, the Rotary Club of Sarnia hosts the annual public Mackinac Pancake Breakfast alongside the Mackinac sail race that runs through Point Edward’s riverfront during July.  Guests from all over the county come participate in the breakfast while enjoying the scenic surroundings of Point Edward, and the numbers are only growing. Rain or shine, members of the club work to serve pancakes, sausages and coffee to over 2,000 guests who come to enjoy the races that weekend. This year, the funds are pledged to support the building of a public splash pad for the village.

Bridge Bash 

During the Mackinac events, Point Edward’s Optimist Club hosts a three-night concert event with a program starring upcoming out-of-town and local acts.  Bridge Bash, entertains the concert goers through both country and rock and roll performances on separate nights. The event holds a general and V.I.P. area which offers a selection of barbecue food items for all guests and alcohol based vendors for those in the V.I.P sections. Admissions and donations are contributed to the production of the splash pad for Point Edward’s waterfront.

The Moon Light Farmer's Market 

The 2015 summer brings a new attraction under the Blue Water Bridge at Point Edward’s waterfront that supports local businesses and farmers. The Moon Light Farmers market consists of vendors of all different types of food and produce set up along the Michigan Street pathway every Thursday night beginning at 4:00p.m. This new addition to Point Edward brings awareness of local businesses and contributes to increasing interest in the village’s downtown area.

Schools 

Point Edward is home to Bridgeview Public School. It was opened in the late 1940s to house the growing number of children in the village. The previous school was located where Optimist Park currently is. Bridgeview houses grades from junior kindergarten to Grade 8. It also has one of the best outfitted classroom facilities for special needs students in Southwestern Ontario. The Lambton Kent District School Board has closed a number of elementary schools due to low capacity, although Bridgeview remains open because of the highly valued special needs facilities.

Transportation

Federal Bridge Corporation operates and maintains the Blue Water Bridge, a twin-span bridge across the Saint Clair River to Michigan, along with its associated customs and immigration facilities. The company has bought and closed several houses along St. Clair and Alexandra Ave. It owns and maintains a great deal of land in Point Edward, but there is little room left for expansion.

Demographics

Parks 

 Waterfront Park
 Veterans Memorial Park
 Simpson Street Park
 Elks Park
 Optimist Park
 Helena Street Park
 Hillier Park
 McCrae Park
 Tennis Courts

Notable residents

 Brad Boston, sailor who competed in the 1996 Summer Olympics
 Don Burgess, ice hockey left winger
 William Guthrie, member of the Legislative Assembly of Ontario
 Duke Harris, ice hockey right winger
 Peter Mara, ice hockey forward

References

External links
 

Villages in Ontario
Lower-tier municipalities in Ontario
Municipalities in Lambton County
Populated places on Lake Huron in Canada